Brenda Jean Bakke (born May 15, 1963) is an American actress and real estate broker. She is best known for her roles in 1990s films Hot Shots! Part Deux, Gunmen, Demon Knight, Under Siege 2: Dark Territory, and L.A. Confidential.

Life and career
Bakke was born in Klamath Falls, Oregon, and began her acting career in a Portland stage production of Years Ago at age 15.  After graduating in 1981 from Sunset High School, near Beaverton, Oregon, she moved to Los Angeles to study acting at the American Academy of Dramatic Arts. She made her screen debut in the 1986 movie Hardbodies 2, and the following year,  guest starred in an episode of Star Trek: The Next Generation. In later years, she had a number of roles in low-budget genre movies, such as Gunhed, Solar Crisis, and The Medium.

In 1993, Bakke starred as Michelle Huddleston in the comedy film Hot Shots! Part Deux,  where she played a spoof on Sharon Stone's character (Catherine Tramell) from Basic Instinct and romantic interest of Charlie Sheen. The following year, she played the female leading role in the action-comedy film, Gunmen. In 1995, she appeared as Cordelia the prostitute in Ernest Dickerson's Demon Knight, and as Captain Linda Gilder in Under Siege 2.

During the 1995-96 television season, she was a regular cast member in the CBS horror series, American Gothic alongside Gary Cole. In 1997, Bakke appeared as Lana Turner in the neo-noir mystery crime film, L.A. Confidential, directed by Curtis Hanson. In 1999, she returned to television with the role of the lead character's mother in the short-lived Fox drama series, Ryan Caulfield: Year One.

In 2000s, Bakke continued appearing in films, playing roles in smaller movies, such as The Quickie and Moving August. She spent the following years playing guest star roles in episodes of CSI: Crime Scene Investigation, NYPD Blue, The Mentalist, and Supernatural. In 2015, she began appearing in the recurring role of Virginia in the Oprah Winfrey Network prime time soap opera If Loving You Is Wrong. In 2016, Bakke appeared in guest starring roles in episodes of Heartbeat and Criminal Minds: Beyond Borders.

Filmography

Film

Television

References

External links
 
 
 

1963 births
Living people
20th-century American actresses
21st-century American actresses
Actresses from Portland, Oregon
American Academy of Dramatic Arts alumni
American film actresses
American people of Norwegian descent
American stage actresses
American television actresses
People from Klamath Falls, Oregon
Sunset High School (Beaverton, Oregon) alumni